Lauri Tuohimaa (born 25 January 1979) is a musician from Oulu, Finland. He played guitar in Charon (2003-2011), For My Pain... (1999-2004) and Embraze (1994–2009), in which he was also the lead vocalist. Lauri first played in a band called Maple Cross before forming Embraze with drummer Ilkka Leskelä, Petri Hennell and Mikko Aaltonen under the name Embrace. His influences include Pantera and CMX.

Discography

Albums 

Allotria (1995) with Embraze (As Embrace)
96 (1996) with Embraze (As Embrace)
Demo 3 (1996) with Embraze (As Embrace)
IV (1997) with Embraze (As Embrace)
LAEH (1998) with Embraze
Intense (1999) with Embraze
Endless Journey (2001) With Embraze
Katharsis (2002) with Embraze
Fallen(2003) with For My Pain
The Dying Daylights (2003) with Charon
Songs for the Sinners (2005) with Charon
The Last Embrace (2006) with Embraze

Singles 

"Sin, Love and the Devil" (1999) with Embraze
"In Trust of No One" (2003) with Charon
"Religious/Delicious" (2003) with Charon
"Killing Romance" (2004) with For My Pain
"Ride on Tears" (2005) with Charon
"Colder" (2005) with Charon
"The One" (2006) with Embraze
"Close Your Eyes" (2011) with Union of the Slaves

Compilations 

Metal Rock Cavalcade II (2003), Embraze- "My Star"
Mastervox Metal Single, Embraze- "Chemical Warfare" (Slayer Cover)
Straight to Hell- A Tribute to Slayer, Embraze- "Chemical Warfare"
Metalliliitto II- Embraze- "Close my Stage"

References 

People from Oulu
Finnish heavy metal guitarists
1979 births
Living people
21st-century guitarists